Football Club Valdagno is an Italian football club based in Valdagno, Veneto.

History
The first club was founded ad FC Pasubio in 1926 and became AC Valdagno in 1928. In 1933 it was bought by the textile manufacturers Marzotto. It played in Serie B during the ‘50s. In 1997 it started the first of many confusing fusions with many clubs, which led to a long list of bankruptcies.

Trissino-Valdagno 
A secondary club was founded in 2012 after the merger between A.C.D. Trissino and A.C. Nuova Valdagno.

The club was dissolved in 2014 after the merger with  S.S.D. Calcio Marano, founding F.C.D. Altovicentino.

Before the merger

Trissino 
A.C. Trissino was founded in 1924, later changing its name to A.C.D. Trissino,  with this name in the season 2011-12 won Eccellenza Veneto/A and so was promoted to Serie D.

Nuova Valdagno 
Dopolavoro Aziendale Marzotto (DAM) Valdagno was founded in 1926, later changing its name to A.C. Marzotto (after the Marzotto firm, owner of the team at the time) and with this name spent 10 seasons in Serie B. The club was later renamed A.C. Valdagno.

The side was refounded as A.C. Nuova Valdagno in 1998. In its last season, the team won Promozione and was promoted to Eccellenza Veneto. In summer 2012 it sold its sports title of Eccellenza to club A.S.D. Nuovo Calcio Grancona that was consequently renamed A.S.D. Boca Ascesa Val Liona.

FC 
The current club was created in 2017 buying an Eccellenza club from
Vicenza.

Colors and badge 
The team's colors are white and light blue.

References

External links
Official Site

Football clubs in Italy
Association football clubs established in 1926
Football clubs in Veneto
Serie B clubs
Serie C clubs
Serie D clubs
2005 establishments in Italy
Association football clubs established in 2017
2017 establishments in Italy